Balikpapan–Samarinda Toll Road or Balsam Toll Road is an expressway which is constructed to connect Balikpapan with Samarinda of East Kalimantan, Indonesia as well as the proposed new capital city of the country.

History
This is the first expressway in Borneo island, including its Indonesian part. Samboja-Samarinda section of the toll road has been inaugurated by President Joko Widodo on 17 December 2019. On 24 August 2021, the toll has officially connected both Balikpapan and Samarinda through the inaugurations of sections I and V.

Development
The construction of the  expressway was started on 12 January 2011. The project was officially inaugurated by Governor of East Kalimantan, but the construction halted in 2012 because of  financial shortage. In November 2015, President Joko Widodo relaunched the construction of the toll road. In early September 2019, the toll constructions have achieved 97 percent and predicted will be finished in October 2019. The toll road will also be connected to the proposed new capital city of Indonesia.

Sections
Balikpapan-Samarinda toll road consists of five sections,
Section 1: starts from KM 13 to Samboja along ; it is formally opened on 21 August 2021
Section 2: from Samboja to Muara Jawa along , it is formally opened on 17 December 2019;
Section 3: from Muara Jawa to Palaran along , it is formally opened on 17 December 2019;

Exits

See also

Trans-Kalimantan Highway Southern Route

References

Transport in East Kalimantan
Toll roads in Kalimantan
Samarinda
Balikpapan